The women's javelin throw at the 1966 European Athletics Championships was held in Budapest, Hungary, at Népstadion on 2 and 3 September 1966.

Medalists

Results

Final
3 September

Qualification
2 September

Participation
According to an unofficial count, 16 athletes from 8 countries participated in the event.

 (3)
 (1)
 (3)
 (1)
 (2)
 (3)
 (2)
 (1)

References

Javelin throw
Javelin throw at the European Athletics Championships
Euro